"I'm a Man You Don't Meet Every Day" (Roud 975) is a traditional Scottish or Irish music hall song written from the point of view of a rich landowner telling the story of his day while buying drinks at a public house. According to Archie Fisher, the song is "an Irish narrative ballad that has been shortened to an Aberdeenshire drinking song".

It is also known under the titles Jock Stuart, Jock Stewart or Jock Steward.

Various versions of the song exist. A "boastful Irish ditty" of that title is recorded as early as the 1880s.
It was also passed on from Frederick “Cauliflower” Crossman, who had worked with Cecil Sharp, to Crossman's granddaughter.
Its most famous version is Jeannie Robertson's from 1960. A recent popular version was recorded in 1985 by the Pogues, with bass player Cait O'Riordan on vocals. In both Robertson's and O'Riordan's versions, the song's first-person narrator is presented by a woman, despite the song's masculine narrative.

Recordings
Jeannie Robertson on Scottish Ballads and Folk Songs (1960)
The McCalmans on Smuggler (1975)
Archie Fisher on The Man With a Rhyme as Jock Stewart (1976)
The Tannahill Weavers on The Tannahill Weavers (1979)
Dougie MacLean on CRM (1979), as Jock Stewart
Houghton Weavers on In The Rare Ould Times (1983)
The Pogues on Rum Sodomy & the Lash (1985)
The Dubliners on 30 Years A-Greying (1992)
Danú on All Things Considered (2002)
Hadrian's Wall on Hadrian's Wall (2006), as Jock Stewart
Fontaines D.C. Live recording for SiriusXM (2020)
The Banshees of Inisherin Partially performed in pub scene of 2022 film.

See also
 Roud Folk Song Index

References

External links
Lyrics and chords

Irish folk songs
Irish songs
The Dubliners songs
The Pogues songs